Oakfield Wood is a  nature reserve west of Wrabness in Essex. It is managed by the Essex Wildlife Trust.

This is former farmland which is being converted into a "green burial ground", overlooking the Stour Estuary. A native broadleaved tree is planted for each burial with a wooden plaque at the base. When the burial ground is full, it will be managed by the trust as a nature reserve.

There is access to the site carpark from Wheatsheaf Lane by a track which leads through Wrabness Nature Reserve carpark.

References

 Essex Wildlife Trust